Freshlyground are a South African Afro-fusion band that formed in Cape Town in 2002. The band members have different backgrounds, including South Africa, Mozambique, and Zimbabwe. Freshlyground's musical style blends elements of traditional South African music (such as kwela and African folk music), blues, jazz, and features of indie rock. They are best known for their performance "Waka Waka (This Time for Africa)" with Colombian singer Shakira, which received worldwide recognition. The music video – featuring the group – also received over 3 billion views on YouTube, making it the 21st most watched video on the entire site.

Band members
Zolani Mahola (2002–2019) – lead vocals 
Simon Attwell (2002–present) – flute saxophone keyboard and band management
Peter Cohen (2002–present) – drums
Julio "Gugs" Sigauque (2002–present) – lead guitar (steel-string acoustic guitar)
Chris "Bakkies" Bakalanga (2016–present) – lead guitar
Kyla-Rose Smith (2003–2016) – violin and vocals
Josh Hawks (2002–present) – bass, backing vocals
Shaggy Scheepers (2008–present) – percussion
Aron Turest-Swartz (2002–2009) – keyboard

History

Jika Jika (2003)
Freshlyground released their debut album, Jika Jika, in early 2003. The commercial success of this album ultimately kick-started their career and re-affirmed their reputation as a fresh and vibrant young face in South African music. The commercial success of this album launched their career through their reputation as a vibrant South African band. The exposure from this album resulted in an invitation for the band to perform at both the Harare International Festival of the Arts and the Robben Island African Festival. This album was remixed by Keith Farquharson, remastered by Chris Athens and re-released in 2008.

Nomvula (2004–2006)
In 2004, Freshlyground participated in the opening of Parliament of South Africa by perfoganised as a celebration of ten years of democracy in South Africa.

At the Harare International Festival of the Arts (HIFA), Freshlyground performed with Zimbabwean musician Oliver Mtukudzi.

The band went on to perform alongside local legend Miriam Makeba, as well as Stanley Clarke and Femi Kuti at the North Sea Jazz Festival, held during April in Cape Town. July also marked a break from the recording studio for the band, who had been working hard on their then unreleased album Nomvula. The band took this time to perform at the Villa Celimontana Festival in Rome, Italy.

Finally, in late 2004, Freshlyground released their very successful album, Nomvula. Although the uptake of the album was initially slow, it eventually went on to achieve double platinum status locally. Initial success was largely due to the catchy, feel-good, lyrics of Doo Be Doo, which enjoyed significant play on local radio, it was also covered in Indonesian by singer Gita Gutawa. Follow-up hits included I'd like and the signature track Nomvula, the former achieving unprecedented success on radio charts such as the 5FM Top 40, where it remained at No. 1 for several weeks.

Ma'Cheri (2007)
The album Ma'Cheri was released on 3 September 2007.  The album was again produced by JB Arthur and Victor Masondo, engineered by David Langemann and was recorded in Cape Town. The first single is called Pot Belly followed by Fired Up and Desire.

Radio Africa (2010)
Freshlyground's album Radio Africa was released in May 2010, and as part of the album release, they released a collaborative music video with the ZANews puppeteers. A satirical track about Robert Mugabe (Chicken to Change) has received coverage in the British media.

Cape Town Stadium Soccer Festival
On 23 January 2010, Freshlyground performed at the official inauguration game at the new Cape Town Stadium, where local Cape Town football clubs Ajax Cape Town and Santos played each other in a match decided on penalties.

2010 FIFA World Cup
A song by Colombian pop star Shakira and Freshlyground was the official song of the 2010 FIFA World Cup. The song, titled "Waka Waka (This Time for Africa)", is based on "Zangalewa", a popular Makossa African soldiers' song by Golden Sounds. "Zangalewa" was a hit single in Colombia in 1987. Shakira and Freshlyground performed the song at the pre-tournament kick-off concert in Soweto on 10 June.

The following July, the band also took part in the official handing-over ceremony, which took place in South Africa.

The Legend (2013)
"This album captures the emotion, the passion and the energy of our live performances", explains violinist Kyla-Rose Smith adding, "our live concerts have always been at the bedrock of our popularity", she says.

Honours
In 2005, Freshlyground was nominated for three South African Music Awards for their 2004 album, Nomvula. Although they won no SAMAs that year, in 2008 the Recording Industry of South Africa awarded them the coveted Best Duo or Group SAMA. In the same year, their 2007 album Ma' Cheri won the prestigious Album of the Year SAMA, as well as Best Adult Contemporary Album: English, and Best Engineer.

At the 2006 MTV Europe Music Awards in Copenhagen, Freshlyground became the first South African musical act to receive honours from MTV, when they received the MTV Europe Music Award for Best African Act.

At the 2008 Channel O Music Video Awards, the band received the "Best Africa, Southern" accolade for their single "Pot Belly". In 2008 the band was awarded the South African Music Awards for their album "Macheri."

Discography

Albums

Jika Jika (2003)
 "Train Love" (4:12)
 "Ocean Floor" (3:15)
 "Rain" (5:07)
 "Castles in the Sky" (3:20)
 "Feels Like Sunday" (3:40)
 "Mbira No. 2" (2:18)
 "Zipho Phezulu" (3:06)
 "Mali" (4:07)
 "Castles in the Sky" (3:36)
 "Mowbray Kaap" (6:04)
 "Nomvula" (7:27)

Nomvula (2004) 
(#ITA 96)

 "I am the man" (4:57)
 "Nomvula" (4:46)
 "Manyana" (5:13)
 "Vanish" (5:20)
 "Zithande" (4:40)
 "I'd like" (6:25)
 "Doo Be Doo" (5:14)
 "Things Have Changed" (4:17)
 "Buttercup" (5:37)
 "Human Angels" (6:25)
 "Father Please" (4:03)
 "Mowbray Kaap" (6:03)
 "Touch in the Night" (2:44)
 "Doo Be Doo (Remix)" (European bonus track)

Ma' Cheri (2007)
 "Ma' Cheri" (4:31)
 "Desire" (4:13)
 "Pot Belly" (4:15)
 "Ask Me" (4:26)
 "Baby Tonight" (4:51)
 "Fired Up" (4:11)
 "Gogorilla" (4:18)
 "Arms of Steel" (4:32)
 "Pink Confetti" (3:47)
 "Zulu Lounge" (5:52)
 "Ivana" (4:18)
 "Umalume" (5:15)
 "Crimson Smile" (3:36)
 "Manikiniki" (6:30)
 "Air Hostess" (bonus track) (4:09)

Radio Africa (2010)
 "Moto" (3:39)
 "Fire Is Low" (4:02)
 "The Dream of Love" (3:29)
 "Big Man feat. Les Nubians" (3:47)
 "Baba" (3:16)
 "Baby in Silence" (3:40)
 "Would You Mind" (3:08)
 "Vula Amehlo" (3:51)
 "Chicken to Change" (4:20)
 "Working Class" (4:01)
 "Whaliphalaligazi" (4:22)
 "Waka Waka (Afro Fab Mix)" (3:24) [Bonus Track]
 "Wanna Be Startin' Somethin'" (5:23) [Bonus Track]
 "Big Man (Beefcake Mix)" (3:31) [Bonus Track]

Take Me to the Dance (2012)
 "Chain Gang" (3:35)
 "Everything" (3:55)
 "Nomthandazo" (4:08)
 "Not Too Late for Love" (3:59)
 "Take Me to the Dance" (4:06)
 "The Man Moves" (3:20)
 "Won't Let Go" (4:14)
 "Mina Nobhiza" (5:35)
 "Dancing Baby" (0:56)
 "The Message" (5:16)
 "Leave a Light On" (3:50)
 "Shake It (Julst Like You Wanna)" (3:57)
 "You Would Love" (4:49)
 "Party Time" (3:22)
 "Everybody Must Get Stoned" (bonus track) (0:36)

The Legend (2013)
 "Izihlangu" (4:55)
 "Africa Unite" (4:03)
 "Shake It" (3:50)
 "Refugee" (3:54)
 "Take Me to the Dance [Boxsta Remix]" (4:39)
 "Beautiful Boy" (4:00)
 "Everything" (3:54)
 "How Low Can Yu Go" (3:21)
 "Yeah Yeah" (4:12)
 "Rain [Live at Guild Theater, East London]" (6:27)
 "Doo Be Doo [Live at Guild Theater, East London]" (6:36)
 "Rain [Live at Guild Theater, East London]" (7:00)
 "Waka Waka [Live at Centenary Hall, New Brighton, Port Elizabeth]" (5:57)

As featured artists
 "Waka Waka (This Time for Africa)"(2010 FIFA World Cup single by Shakira)

References

External links
 

Folk music groups
Musical groups from Cape Town
South African musical groups
Wrasse Records artists
MTV Europe Music Award winners